Imam Abdulayevich Khataev (born 31 August 1994) is a Russian boxer. He competed in the men's light heavyweight event at the 2020 Summer Olympics, where he was defeated by Briton Benjamin Whittaker by a score of 4–1 in the semifinals.

References

External links
 

1994 births
Living people
Russian male boxers
Olympic boxers of Russia
Boxers at the 2020 Summer Olympics
People from Achkhoy-Martanovsky District
European Games competitors for Russia
Boxers at the 2019 European Games
Medalists at the 2020 Summer Olympics
Olympic medalists in boxing
Olympic bronze medalists for the Russian Olympic Committee athletes
Sportspeople from Chechnya
21st-century Russian people